Fred Barthold Norman (March 21, 1882 – April 18, 1947) was a U.S. Representative from Washington.

Born on a farm near Martinsville, Illinois, Norman attended the public schools and was graduated from Martinsville High School.
He moved to Lebam, Washington, in 1901.
He worked on farms, in logging camps, sawmills, shingle mills, and shipyards 1901-1922.
He engaged in the wholesale and retail tobacco and candy business since 1922.
He served as member of the city council of Raymond, Washington from 1916 to 1918.
He served in the State house of representatives in 1919 and 1920.
He served as member of the State senate 1925-1935.

Norman was elected as a Republican to the Seventy-eighth Congress (January 3, 1943 – January 3, 1945).
He was an unsuccessful candidate for reelection in 1944 to the Seventy-ninth Congress.

Norman was elected in 1946 to the Eightieth Congress and served from January 3, 1947, until his death in Washington, D.C., on April 18, 1947.
He was interred in Fern Hill Cemetery, Menlo, Washington.

See also
 List of United States Congress members who died in office (1900–49)

Sources

1882 births
1947 deaths
Republican Party members of the United States House of Representatives from Washington (state)
20th-century American politicians
People from Clark County, Illinois
People from Pacific County, Washington
Republican Party members of the Washington House of Representatives
Republican Party Washington (state) state senators